Cicurina brevis is a species of araneomorph spider in the family Dictynidae. It is found in the USA and Canada.

References

Further reading

 
 
 
 
 
 
 
 

Hahniidae
Articles created by Qbugbot
Spiders described in 1890